Haruma Saikyo is a Japanese kickboxer, fighting out of Tokyo, Japan. He is the former Krush Featherweight champion.

As of 1 August 2020, he is ranked the #9 strawweight in the world by Combat Press.

Kickboxing career
After going 2-1 in his first three fights, Saikyo went on an eight fight winning streak, most notably defeating Yoshiki Takei and Taio Asahisa. His winning streak earned him the chance to challenge Kaito Ozawa for the Krush Featherweight title during Krush 81. He won the title by unanimous decision. He lost his next fight against Tatsuya Tsubakihara by majority decision, before successfully defending his Krush title with an extra round split decision against Yuta Murakoshi.

Haruma took part in the 2018 Featherweight Grand Prix. In the quarter final, he won a close split decision against Hirotaka Asahisa. In the semifinal, he won a unanimous decision against Ryusei Ashizawa. He fought a rematch with Yuta Murakoshi in the tournament final, but lost by TKO due to leg injury.

Following this loss, Saikyo attempted to defend his Krush title for the second time during Krush 97, when he was scheduled to fight Yuki Egawa. Egawa won the fight by majority decision.

Saikyo achieved his first, and only, win of 2019 through a knockout of Jorge Varela in June 2019.

Saikyo participated in the K-1 Featherweight Grand Prix during the K-1 World GP 2019 Yokohamatsuri event. He fought Arthur Meyer in the quarter final, and lost by TKO breaking his leg during the second round.

Saikyo faced Riku Morisaka at K-1 World GP 2022 Yokohamatsuri on September 11, 2022, following a two-year absence from the sport. He lost the fight by split decision, after an extra fourth round was contested.

Titles and accomplishments
Professional
K-1
 2018 K-1 World GP -57.5kg World Tournament Runner-Up
Krush
 2017 Krush Featherweight -58 kg Champion(1 Defense)

Amateur
 2015 K-1 Koshien -55 kg Champion
 2014 All Japan Shin Karate K-2 Grand Prix Lightweight Champion
 2013 REBELS Blow-Cup Tournament -60 kg Champion
 2013 Shin Karate Tokyo K-2 Tournament Lightweight Champion

Kickboxing record

|-  style="text-align:center; background:#fbb;"
| 2022-09-11 || Loss || align=left| Riku Morisaka||  K-1 World GP 2022 Yokohamatsuri  || Yokohama, Japan || Ext.R Decision (Split) || 4 || 3:00
|-  style="background:#Fbb;"
| 2019-11-24 || Loss || align=left| Arthur Meyer || K-1 World GP 2019 Yokohamatsuri, -57 kg Tournament Quarter Final  || Yokohama, Japan ||TKO (Leg injury/Low Kick) || 2 || 1:59
|-  style="background:#CCFFCC;"
| 2019-06-30|| Win ||align=left| Jorge Varela || K-1 World GP 2019 Super Bantamweight World Tournament || Saitama, Japan || KO (Knee to the head) || 3 || 1:27
|-  style="background:#Fbb;"
| 2019-01-26 || Loss || align=left| Yuki Egawa || Krush.97 || Tokyo, Japan || Decision (Majority) || 3 || 3:00
|-
! style=background:white colspan=9 |
|-  style="background:#Fbb;"
| 2018-06-17 || Loss || align=left| Yuta Murakoshi || K-1 World GP 2018: 2nd Featherweight Championship Tournament, Final || Saitama, Japan || TKO (Ankle Injury) || 1 || 0:49
|-
! style=background:white colspan=9 |
|-  style="background:#cfc;"
| 2018-06-17 || Win || align=left| Ryusei Ashizawa || K-1 World GP 2018: 2nd Featherweight Championship Tournament, Semi Finals || Saitama, Japan || Decision (Unanimous) || 3 || 3:00
|-  style="background:#cfc;"
| 2018-06-17|| Win ||align=left| Hirotaka Asahisa || K-1 World GP 2018: 2nd Featherweight Championship Tournament, Quarter Finals|| Saitama, Japan || Decision (Split) || 3 || 3:00
|-  style="background:#cfc;"
| 2018-03-10|| Win ||align=left| Yuta Murakoshi || Krush.86 || Tokyo, Japan || Extra Round Decision (Split)|| 4 || 3:00
|-
! style=background:white colspan=9 |
|-  style="background:#Fbb;"
| 2017-12-27|| Loss ||align=left| Tatsuya Tsubakihara||K-1 Survival Wars|| Tokyo, Japan || Decision (Majority) || 3 || 3:00
|-  style="background:#cfc;"
| 2017-10-01|| Win ||align=left| Kaito Ozawa || Krush.81 || Tokyo, Japan || Decision (Unanimous)|| 3 || 3:00
|-
! style=background:white colspan=9 |
|-  style="background:#cfc;"
| 2017-06-18|| Win ||align=left|  Kaito Ozawa ||K-1 World GP 2017 Super Middleweight Championship Tournament || Saitama, Japan || Decision (Unanimous)|| 3 || 3:00
|-  style="background:#cfc;"
| 2017-04-02|| Win ||align=left| Elias Mahmoudi || Krush.75 || Tokyo, Japan || Decision (Majority)|| 3 || 3:00
|-  style="background:#cfc;"
| 2016-12-03|| Win ||align=left| Chen Qicong|| Wu Lin Feng 2016: WLF x Krush - China vs Japan || Zhengzhou, China || Decision (Unanimous) || 3 || 3:00
|-  style="background:#cfc;"
| 2016-10-15|| Win ||align=left| Shota Oiwa || Krush.70 || Tokyo, Japan || TKO (Referee Stoppage/Punches)|| 1 || 0:31
|-  style="background:#cfc;"
| 2016-06-24|| Win ||align=left| Taio Asahisa || K-1 World GP 2016 -65kg World Tournament || Tokyo, Japan || Decision (Majority)|| 3 || 3:00
|-  style="background:#cfc;"
| 2016-04-10|| Win ||align=left| Takaaki|| Krush.65 || Tokyo, Japan || KO (Body kick) || 2 || 2:10
|-  style="background:#cfc;"
| 2015-04-19|| Win ||align=left| Yoshiki Takei || K-1 World GP 2015 -55kg Championship Tournament|| Tokyo, Japan || Decision (Majority) || 3 || 3:00
|-  style="background:#cfc;"
| 2015-01-04|| Win ||align=left| Yoshiki || Krush.49 || Tokyo, Japan || KO (Left High Kick) || 1 || 0:07
|-  style="background:#Fbb;"
| 2014-11-09|| Loss ||align=left| Chikara Iwao|| Krush.47|| Tokyo, Japan || Decision (Unanimous) || 3 || 3:00
|-  style="background:#cfc;"
| 2014-09-15|| Win ||align=left| Ryota|| Krush-EX 2014 vol.5|| Tokyo, Japan || Decision (Unanimous) || 3 || 3:00
|-  style="background:#cfc;"
| 2014-06-12|| Win ||align=left| Shishimaru || Krush.42|| Tokyo, Japan || TKO (3 knopckdowns) || 2 || 2:42
|-
| colspan=9 | Legend:    

|-  style="background:#CCFFCC;"
| 2015-11-21|| Win ||align=left| Tatsuya Tsubakihara || K-1 World GP 2015 The Championship, K-1 Koshien 2015 Tournament Final || Tokyo, Japan || Decision (Split) || 3 || 2:00
|-
! style=background:white colspan=9 |
|-  style="background:#CCFFCC;"
| 2015-08-15|| Win ||align=left| Rikuto Morishita || K-1 Koshien 2015 Tournament, Semi Final || Tokyo, Japan || Decision (Majority) || 1 || 3:00
|-  style="background:#CCFFCC;"
| 2015-08-15|| Win ||align=left| Tomoya Yokoyama || K-1 Koshien 2015 Tournament, Quarter Final || Tokyo, Japan || Ext.R Decision (Majority) || 2 || 3:00
|-  style="background:#CCFFCC;"
| 2015-08-15|| Win ||align=left| Sho Uchida || K-1 Koshien 2015 Tournament, First Round || Tokyo, Japan || Decision (Majority) || 1 || 3:00
|-  style="background:#FFBBBB;"
| 2014-07-21|| Loss|| align=left| Yuto Shinohara || K-1 Koshien 2014 Tournament, Quarter Final || Tokyo, Japan || Decision (Unanimous)|| 1 ||2:00
|-  style="background:#CCFFCC;"
| 2014-07-21|| Win|| align=left| Naoki Takahashi || K-1 Koshien 2014 Tournament, Second Round || Tokyo, Japan || Decision (Majority)|| 1 ||2:00
|-  style="background:#CCFFCC;"
| 2014-07-21|| Win|| align=left| Shunki Iwamoto || K-1 Koshien 2014 Tournament, First Round || Tokyo, Japan || Decision (Unanimous) || 1 ||2:00
|-  style="background:#CCFFCC;"
| 2013-12-22|| Win|| align=left| Koji Ueno || REBELS Amateur BLOW-CUP 23 Tournament, Final || Tokyo, Japan || Decision || 1 ||3:00
|-
! style=background:white colspan=9 |
|-  style="background:#CCFFCC;"
| 2013-12-22|| Win|| align=left| Shinjiro Saito || REBELS Amateur BLOW-CUP 23 Tournament, Semi Final || Tokyo, Japan || KO || 1 ||
|-  style="background:#CCFFCC;"
| 2013-12-22|| Win|| align=left| Shinnosuke Nakamura || REBELS Amateur BLOW-CUP 23 Tournament, Quarter Final || Tokyo, Japan || Decision ||  1||3:00
|- style="background:#FFBBBB;"
| 2012-06-03|| Loss|| align="left" | Tenshin Nasukawa || BigBang 8 ||Tokyo, Japan|| Decision || 3 || 2:00
|-  style="background:#CCFFCC;"
| 2011-12-04|| Win|| align=left| Shogo Hosoda || 4th Kokusai Junior Kickboxing || Tokyo, Japan || Decision ||  ||
|- style="background:#FFBBBB;"
| 2011-07-18|| Loss || align="left" | Tenshin Nasukawa || MA Kick BREAK-16 - GRASP ||Tokyo, Japan|| Decision || 3 || 1:30
|-
! style=background:white colspan=9 |
|- style="background:#FFBBBB;"
| 2011-04-24|| Loss || align="left" | Tenshin Nasukawa || MA Kick BREAK-12 -It starts- ||Tokyo, Japan|| Decision || 3 || 1:30
|-
! style=background:white colspan=9 |
|- style="background:#CCFFCC;"
| 2011-04-17|| Win || align="left" | Yuzuki Sakai || MA Kick Amateur 135 ||Tokyo, Japan|| Decision || 2 || 1:30
|-  style="background:#FFBBBB;"
| 2009-09-27|| Loss||align=left| Yoshiki Takei ||  || Saitama Prefecture, Japan || ||  || 
|-
| colspan=9 | Legend:

See also
 List of male kickboxers

References

Living people
1998 births
Japanese male kickboxers
People from Ebina, Kanagawa
Sportspeople from Kanagawa Prefecture